AMTD Digital is a Hong Kong–based financial technology firm. It is a subsidiary of the AMTD Group, a financial services group based in Hong Kong. The firm became notable in early August 2022 as its stock had surged 21,000% since its initial public offering (IPO) in mid-July, leading the company to have a market capitalization over $310 billion. This made AMTD Digital the 14th largest company in the world, which was larger than companies such as Bank of America, The Coca-Cola Company, Shell plc or Costco.

Company overview
AMTD Digital was founded in 2019 by Calvin Choi, a former UBS investment banker. The firm is owned by AMTD Idea which holds 88.7% of its shares and is ultimately owned by the AMTD Group, a financial services group. Choi is also the chairman of the AMTD Group. Currently, Choi is appealing a decision from the Securities and Futures Commission regarding a two-year ban from the securities industry due to activities he performed back when he was a dealmaker at UBS.

AMTD Digital provides digital services to clients mainly from the financial sector using its software platform, AMTD SpiderNet. The firm operates across four lines of business: Digital Financial Services, Digital Media, Content & Marketing, SpiderNet Ecosystem Solutions and Digital Investments. The company’s revenue mainly comes from fees and commissions levied on its Digital Financial Service business and its SpiderNet Ecosystem Solutions segment.

On July 15, 2022, the firm held an IPO on the New York Stock Exchange with a price of $7.80 and ticker symbol "HKD".

August 2022 stock surge
The price of AMTD Digital for its listing on July 15 was $7.80 per share and by August 2, the price had peaked at $1,679, which was an increase of 21,000% since listing. The causes of the stock surge remains unknown. One suggestion was that its ticker symbol of HKD on the NY exchange led traders to confuse it with the Hong Kong dollar. It was reported that r/wallstreetbets, a subreddit of the website Reddit, were involved, although this was denied by the users themselves. The phenomenon has drawn comparisons to the GameStop short squeeze and the AMC Theatres stock surge. Its parent company, AMTD Idea Group (NYSE:AMTD), also benefited, where it was the highest traded stock on August 2 according to Fidelity Investments and rose 300% in the same week.

Since August 2, the stock price of the firm has dropped significantly from its peak. The losses were greater than the entire market value of companies such as Intel or Goldman Sachs. As of the end of the trading day on 16 August, the stock was valued at $181.02 per share.

Li Ka-shing's CK Hutchison Holdings, which owned shares in the firm's ultimate parent, AMTD Group, made a statement to distance itself from AMTD Digital, stating it held no shares in the firm.

References

External links

Companies established in 2019
Companies listed on the New York Stock Exchange
Companies of Hong Kong
Financial software companies
Financial technology companies
2022 initial public offerings